Lactifluus vellereus (formerly Lactarius vellereus), commonly known as the fleecy milk-cap, is a quite large fungus in the genus Lactifluus. It is one of the two most common milk-caps found with beech trees, with the other being Lactarius subdulcis.

Taxonomy and systematics
Lactifluus vellereus is one of a handful of north temperate milk caps that belong to the genus Lactifluus which has been separated from Lactarius on phylogenetic grounds. Its closest species is L. bertillonii, with which it forms a rather isolated clade in the genus.

Description
Like other mushrooms in the family Russulaceae, the L. vellereus fruit body has crumbly, rather than fibrous, flesh, and when this is broken the fungus exudes a milky latex. It has firm flesh, and a stipe which is shorter than the fruit body is wide. The gills are fairly distant (quite far apart), decurrent, and narrow, and have brown specks from the drying milk. The spore print is white in colour.

Lactifluus bertillonii is closely related and very similar, but has hotter milk. Another similar, but phylogenetically distant species is Lactarius controversus, distinguishable mainly by its white gills and lack of rosy markings on the upper cap.

Distribution and habitat

The mushroom is found in deciduous woods, from late summer to early winter. It is found in Britain and Europe.

Edibility
The milk tastes mild on its own, but hot when tasted with the flesh. It is considered inedible because of its peppery taste.

See also
List of Lactifluus species

References

vellereus
Inedible fungi
Fungi described in 1821
Fungi of Europe
Taxa named by Elias Magnus Fries